Lieutenant-Colonel William Blacker (1 September 1777 – 25 November 1855) was a British Army officer, Commissioner of the Treasury of Ireland, and author. His published work is sometimes attributed under the names Fitz Stewart or Colonel Blacker.

Life and career
Born in Carrickblacker House, in the Oneilland East barony in County Armagh, he entered the University of Dublin in the 1790s. Blacker was a participant at the Battle of the Diamond. There, Blacker became one of the original members of the Orange Institution. After earning his degree, Blacker obtained a commission in the 60th Regiment of Foot, then serving in the West Indies, but poor health compelled him to return home. In 1806 he was promoted to major, and in 1812 rose to his final rank of lieutenant-colonel. In 1816 his uncle Sir George Hill, 2nd Baronet appointed Blacker to the Commission of the Treasury of Ireland. He was confirmed Lord Dublin and was the great-grandfather of Sir Cecil Blacker Commandant of Horse.

In 1829, he inherited the family estate upon his father's death. He resigned his military office shortly after and retired to Carrickblacker House. Blacker was buried in Portadown in the Old Seagoe Cemetery.

Writings
Blacker and his relative Valentine Blacker were both lieutenant-colonels, and both were published authors. Because some of the work was published pseudonymously, the two are sometimes confused or conflated in texts.  In The Dublin University Magazine, where his work often appeared, they wrote,  "We know not why Colonel Blacker has chosen not to own himself the author of some papers which in the pages of our own Magazine have excited attention of which any man might feel proud."

Blacker authored a popular poem on military service, Oliver's Advice, originally published in 1834 under his occasional pseudonym, "Fitz Stewart." The poem was widely anthologized. The poem popularized a phrase attributed to Oliver Cromwell as part of a "well-authenticated anecdote." Each stanza ends with a variant of the line, "put your trust in God, my boys, and keep your powder dry." The line appeared in Bartlett's Familiar Quotations attributed to Colonel Blacker.

His 1818 song "The Crimson Banner" commemorates the Siege of Derry during the Williamite War in Ireland.

References

External links
Lieut.-Col. William Blacker From The Dublin University Magazine, Volume 17, Number 101, May 1841

1777 births
1855 deaths
People from County Armagh
Members of the Royal Irish Academy
British Militia officers
Alumni of Trinity College Dublin
People educated at The Royal School, Armagh
British Yeomanry officers
Royal American Regiment officers
Grand Masters of the Orange Order